John A.: Birth of a Country is a Canadian television film, which aired on CBC Television in 2011.

Dramatizing the events that led up to Canadian Confederation in 1867 based on Richard Gwyn's non-fiction book John A.: The Man Who Made Us, the film stars Shawn Doyle as Sir John A. Macdonald, the first Prime Minister of Canada. The film's cast also includes Peter Outerbridge as George Brown, David La Haye as George-Étienne Cartier, Aidan Devine as John Sandfield Macdonald and Patrick McKenna as Alexander Galt, as well as Michelle Nolden, Peter MacNeill, Cedric Smith and Rob Stewart.

The film won two Canadian Screen Award acting categories at the 1st Canadian Screen Awards, for Lead Actor in Television Film or Miniseries (Doyle) and Supporting Actor in a Drama Program or Series (Outerbridge). It also won the top direction (Jerry Ciccoritti) and writing (Bruce M. Smith) awards.

References

External links

CBC Television original films
2011 in Canadian television
2011 television films
2011 films
English-language Canadian films
Canadian drama television films
2010s Canadian films